Bikou Town is a town under Wen County, in Longnan, Gansu. It is located along the Bailong River, just downstream of the Bikou Dam. In 2008 it had a population of 16,901.

History 
Bikou has been mentioned in Southern Song dynasty poems and Han dynasty documents. Since the Ming dynasty it has been an important trading town, most of its merchants originating from Sichuan. Therefore the town has its own dialect based on Sichuanese dialect Its importance for trade originates from its location as the first navigable spot of the Yangtze basin, used for shipping Longnan's famous medicinal plants to eastern China, and along a main road between Gansu and Sichuan. Nowadays the town is home to industry and tea cultivation.

Together with neighbouring Zhongmiao town, it was the hardest hit area in Gansu from the 2008 Sichuan earthquake. Most of the buildings and infrastructure were destroyed.

During the 1980s, a gold mine was opened near Bikou.

Culture 
Bikou is known for its Sichuan opera.

Administration
The towns administration center is Bifeng Village.

Other administrative villages:
 Xianglang (响浪村)
 Hejiawan (何家湾村)
 Shitudi (石土地村)
 Jingdi (井地村)
 Qushui (曲水村)
 Liziba (李子坝村)
 Baiguo (白果村)

History & Literature
Bikou is mentioned in the opening paragraph of Li Jieren's 1936 novel Ripple on a Standing Pool (sishui weilan, 死水微澜):

Notes and references

Township-level divisions of Gansu
Towns in China
Longnan